Ari Singh II (after 27 July 1724 – 9 March 1773) was the Maharana of Mewar Kingdom (r. 1762–1772).

The younger brother of Pratap Singh II, Ari Singh II was assassinated on 9 March 1773.

Reign
He reigned from 1762 to 1772. In his reign Marathas were weakened in India, but Mahadaji Scindia restored Maratha power in the North. He formed an alliance with Maratha against the Mughal Empire. He was also unable to pay his Maratha mercenaries who ravaged his country later.

References

Mewar dynasty
1724 births
1773 deaths